Serial may refer to:

Arts, entertainment, and media

The presentation of works in sequential segments
 Serial (literature), serialised literature in print
 Serial (publishing), periodical publications and newspapers
 Serial (radio and television), series of radio and television programs that rely on a continuing plot
 Serial film, a series of short subjects, with a continuing story, originally shown in theaters, in conjunction with feature films, particularly in the 1930s and 1940s
 Indian serial, a type of Indian television program

Other uses in arts, entertainment, and media
 Serial (1980 film), based on McFadden's novel, starring Martin Mull and Tuesday Weld
 Serial (podcast), a podcast spinoff of the radio series This American Life
 The Serial: A Year in the Life of Marin County, a 1977 novel by Cyra McFadden

Computing and technology
 SerDes, a Serializer/Deserializer (pronounced sir-deez)
 Serial ATA
 Serial attached SCSI
 Serial bus, e.g.,
I²C
1-Wire
Serial Peripheral Interface Bus (SPI)
UNI/O
 Serial cable, a cable used to transfer information between two devices using a serial communication protocol
 Serial computer, a computer typified by its bit-serial architecture
 Bit-serial architecture, a 1-bit processor or CPU architecture with a 1-bit instruction set and microarchitecture
 Serial communication, the process of sending data one bit at a time, sequentially, over a communication channel or computer bus
 Asynchronous serial communication
 Synchronous serial communication
 Serial port
 Serial SCSI, serial SCSI disk-drives
 Universal Serial Bus, also known as USB

Other uses
 Serial code or serial number
 Serial comma
 Serial killer
 Serial relation in mathematics, a binary relation R that relates every x to some y

See also
 Cereal (disambiguation) (a homophone)
 Serialism (philosophy)
 Serialism, in music
 Series (disambiguation)